The 1963 UCLA Bruins football team was an American football team that represented the University of California, Los Angeles during the 1963 NCAA University Division football season.  In their sixth year under head coach Bill Barnes, the Bruins compiled a 2–8 record (2–2 AAWU) and finished in third place in the Athletic Association of Western Universities.

UCLA's offensive leaders in 1963 were quarterback Larry Zeno with 1,036 passing yards, Jim Colletto with 179 rushing yards, and Kurt Altenberg with 419 receiving yards.

Schedule

References

UCLA
UCLA Bruins football seasons
UCLA Bruins football
UCLA Bruins football